The 2010 American Le Mans Series Monterey presented by Patron was held at Mazda Raceway Laguna Seca during May 20–22, 2010. It was the third round of the 2010 American Le Mans Series season. The 2010 race will be the first time that the race is 6 hours, extending into the darkness for the first time.

Qualifying
The qualifying session saw Guy Smith give Dyson Racing the overall pole. Johnny Mowlem took LMPC pole for PR1/Mathiasen Motorsports, Jaime Melo took the GT pole for Risi and reigning Porsche Supercup champion Jeroen Bleekemolen took GTC pole for Black Swan Racing.

Qualifying result
Pole position winners in each class are marked in bold.

Race

Race result
Class winners in bold.  Cars failing to complete 70% of their class winner's distance are marked as Not Classified (NC).

References

Monterey Sports Car Championships
Monterey